Raorchestes tinniens, also known as the spotted bush frog, black bush frog, and  Rao's bubble-nest frog (the latter two referring to species now considered junior synonyms of R. tinniens), is a species of frog in the family Rhacophoridae. It is endemic to the Nilgiri Hills, a part of the Western Ghats, in Tamil Nadu and Kerala, southern India. It has a rather complicated taxonomic history, and there is still an open issue whether Ixalus montanus Günther, 1876 from Kudremukh (Karnataka), now in synonymy with Raorchestes tinniens, is indeed a valid species.

Description
Dorsum is grey–brown and iris is dark-blackish brown. Flanks and groin are dark-brownish black, and belly is coarsely granular. They are also yellowish brown (instead dark brown) in their flanks and groin.

Distribution and habitat
Raorchestes tinniens is known from the Nilgiri Hills and surroundings. It is a terrestrial species found on the ground or low in the vegetation. It is associated with montane tropical moist evergreen forests, but can also be found in grasslands and modified areas close to forests. It is a common species within its distribution area, but it is threatened by habitat loss and believed to be declining.

Reproduction
Males call even during the daytime. Raorchestes tinniens has direct development (i.e., there is no free-living larval stage). Eggs are laid in a hole in a ground. Froglets hatch after about 19 days.

References

External links

 

tinniens
Frogs of India
Endemic fauna of the Western Ghats
Amphibians described in 1853
Taxa named by Thomas C. Jerdon
Taxonomy articles created by Polbot